José Luis Violeta Lajusticia (25 February 1941 – 5 May 2022) was a Spanish footballer who played as a midfielder for Real Zaragoza and the Spain national team.

Violeta played in Real Zaragoza for fourteen seasons, helping the club to victory in the 1964 and 1966 Copa del Generalísimo Finals. Violeta made 473 official appearances for Real Zaragoza, making him the club's joint all-time leading player.

Violeta made fourteen appearances for the Spain national team.

Honours
Zaragoza
 Inter-Cities Fairs Cup: 1963–64
 Copa del Generalísimo: 1963–64, 1965–66

References

External links
 

1941 births
2022 deaths
Spanish footballers
Footballers from Zaragoza
Association football midfielders
Spain international footballers
CD Puertollano footballers
La Liga players
Segunda División players
Real Zaragoza players